Nakae (written: 中江) is a Japanese surname. Notable people with the surname include:

Daisuke Nakae (born 1985), Japanese professional wrestler
Masato Nakae (1917–1998), United States Army soldier
Shinji Nakae (1935–2007), Japanese voice actor and narrator
Toju Nakae (1608–1648), Japanese Confucian philosopher
Yuji Nakae (born 1960), Japanese film director

Japanese-language surnames